Sven Kubis (born 29 May 1975 in Altdöbern) is a German footballer who plays for Wacker Cottbus-Ströbitz.

Kubis made one appearance in the 2. Fußball-Bundesliga for FC Energie Cottbus during his playing career.

References

External links 
 
Sven Kubis on Fupa

1975 births
Living people
People from Altdöbern
People from Bezirk Cottbus
German footballers
Footballers from Brandenburg
Association football forwards
2. Bundesliga players
FC Energie Cottbus players
FC Energie Cottbus II players
FC Erzgebirge Aue players
VfL Halle 1896 players
Dresdner SC players
1. FC Magdeburg players
FC Oberlausitz Neugersdorf players